North by Northwest is a 1959 American spy thriller film directed by Alfred Hitchcock and starring Cary Grant, Eva Marie Saint and James Mason.

North by Northwest may also refer to:
 Northwest by north, one of the "quarter-winds" on a compass.
 North by Northwest, a 1982 album by Tom Robinson
 North by Northwestern, a daily online news magazine at Northwestern University, Illinois, US